The Halfway tram stop is a tram stop situated at the midpoint of the Great Orme Tramway on the slopes of the Great Orme in Llandudno, Wales. The Great Orme Tramway operates as a two-section funicular, and passengers must change at Halfway between the lower section (to and from the Victoria stop) and the upper section (to and from the Summit stop). The stop is also convenient for the nearby Bronze Age Copper Mines.

As well as being the point at which passengers change cars, the Halfway stop is also the control centre for the Great Orme Tramway. The electric motors which drive the cables that propel the cars are located in the central building of the stop, as are the winchmen who control them.

Trams run approximately every ten minutes to the Summit stop, and roughly every twenty minutes to Victoria, increasing to ten minutes in peak hours. Trams run seasonally only, from late March to late October.

References

Great Orme Tramway
Railway stations in Conwy County Borough